is a former Japanese football player. His brother Tomoyuki Kajino is also a former footballer.

Playing career
Kajino was born in Aichi Prefecture on 9 November 1965. After graduating from Tokyo University of Agriculture, he joined the Yanmar Diesel (later Cerezo Osaka) in 1988. His brother Tomoyuki Kajino played for the club in 1983; they played together until Tomoyuki left the club in 1992. Kajino became a regular player in 1990 and played often. In 1998, he moved to Consadole Sapporo. He retired at the end of the 1999 season.

Club statistics

References

External links

1965 births
Living people
Tokyo University of Agriculture alumni
Association football people from Aichi Prefecture
Japanese footballers
Japan Soccer League players
J1 League players
J2 League players
Japan Football League (1992–1998) players
Cerezo Osaka players
Hokkaido Consadole Sapporo players
Association football defenders